The canton of Saint-Éloy-les-Mines is an administrative division of the Puy-de-Dôme department, central France. It was created at the French canton reorganisation which came into effect in March 2015. Its seat is in Saint-Éloy-les-Mines.

It consists of the following communes:
 
Ars-les-Favets
Ayat-sur-Sioule
Biollet
Bussières
Buxières-sous-Montaigut
La Cellette
Charensat
Châteauneuf-les-Bains
Château-sur-Cher
La Crouzille
Durmignat
Espinasse
Gouttières
Lapeyrouse
Menat
Montaigut
Moureuille
Neuf-Église
Pionsat
Le Quartier
Roche-d'Agoux
Sainte-Christine
Saint-Éloy-les-Mines
Saint-Gervais-d'Auvergne
Saint-Hilaire
Saint-Julien-la-Geneste
Saint-Maigner
Saint-Maurice-près-Pionsat
Saint-Priest-des-Champs
Sauret-Besserve
Servant
Teilhet
Vergheas
Virlet
Youx

References

Cantons of Puy-de-Dôme